Radical Movement of Social Democratic Alliance (RIKSSY) (ΡΙΚΣΣΥ (a play on words with the homophone ρήξη, "rupture"), was a short-lived (2012-2013) political party in Greece, established in December 2012. It was formed by Andreas Loverdos a former minister of the PASOK.

Founding Declaration
The promotion of social democratic ideas, as recorded in its founding declaration.
The reflection and action on national, political, social and cultural issues, with the aim of contributing to convergence, integration and unification of the forces of radical social democracy, reform of modern European Left, democratic-progressive forces of the Greek society, with the ultimate aim of creating a political entity. 
Coordination with other similar movements, organizations, networks and individuals in our field, which will respond to the need of citizens for collective action with the active presence as a necessary and sufficient condition for the achievement of common goals.

2012 establishments in Greece
Political parties established in 2012
Liberal parties in Greece
Social democratic parties in Greece
Defunct political parties in Greece
Pro-European political parties in Greece